School Stream is a mobile app owned by Australian company School Stream that enables its users to receive information about their school. The app has received press coverage throughout 2013 and 2014 and is available on the Apple and Google app stores.

History 
School Stream was founded by Melissa Bridson in 2013. The app was officially launched in late 2013 and quickly gained media attention throughout the first half of 2014. The app has also been the subject of scrutiny by the Education Review at the parent-teacher app conference. As of June 2014, the app was being rolled out to more than 1200 Catholic primary school principals in a bid to help cut down the amount of administrative work involved in keeping members of the Australian Catholic Primary Principals Association up to date with school related information.

School Stream has been tested by a number of different schools since its launch in 2013, including Preshil independent school in Kew, and Thornbury Primary School in Thornbury, Victoria.

Features 
School Stream is aimed at schools and parents of school age children, allowing both parties to keep better track of school news and information that is usually passed on from a school to a parent, via the child. The app enables schools to notify parents about general information, events and excursions, share newsletters, and send out digital permission slips.

Schools purchase a licence for the app which gives them access to all of its features. Parents can sign up for the app and access the information from multiple schools without the need for different logins

References

External links 
 Official Website

Computer-related introductions in 2013
Android (operating system) software
Educational software
IOS software